Poselok Imeni Kalinina (also, Posëlok Imeni Kalinina) is an abandoned village in the Ararat Province of Armenia.

See also
 Ararat Province

References 

Populated places in Ararat Province